Unified may refer to:
 The Unified, a wine symposium held in Sacramento, California, USA
 Unified, the official student newspaper of Canterbury Christ Church University
 UNFD, an Australian record label
 Unified (Sweet & Lynch album), 2017
 Unified (Super8 & Tab album), 2014

Unify may refer to:
 Unify, an album by Electric Universe
 Unify Corporation, former name of Daegis Inc.
 Unify Gathering, an Australian music festival
 Unify GmbH & Co. KG, formerly Siemens Enterprise Communications

See also
 
 
 
 Unification (disambiguation)
 United (disambiguation)
 Unity (disambiguation)